The following lists events that happened during 2012 in Armenia.

Incumbents
 President: Serzh Sargsyan
 Prime Minister: Tigran Sargsyan

Events

January
 January 23 - The French Senate passes a bill that makes it illegal for citizens to deny the Armenian genocide by the Ottoman Empire.

May
 May 4 - Official figures indicate that at least 144 people were injured at an Armenian government campaign event in Yerevan's central square after an explosion during a political rally.
 May 6 - Voters in Armenia go to the polls for a parliamentary election with exit polls showing the ruling Republican Party doing well.

June
 June 5 - Azerbaijan accuses Armenia of shooting dead five of its soldiers on the border of those two countries, a day after three Armenians were killed.
 June 6 - A new clash kills an Armenian soldier in the Nagorno-Karabakh conflict.

July
 July 27-August 12 - 25 athletes from Armenia competed at the 2012 Summer Olympics in London, England, United Kingdom.

August
 August 31 - Armenia suspends diplomatic relations with Hungary after Ramil Safarov's extradition to Azerbaijan.

References

 
Armenia
Armenia
Years of the 21st century in Armenia
2010s in Armenia
Armenia